Air Vice-Marshal Michael John Smeath  (born 2 October 1967) is a senior Royal Air Force officer.

Education
He was educated at the Open University (BSc), King's College London (MA) and Deakin University, Canberra.

RAF career
Smeath was commissioned into the RAF on 15 January 1989. He served as officer commanding No. 34 Squadron. He went on to be Station Commander at RAF Honington in 2014, Liaison Officer to the US Joint Chiefs of Staff Committee in July 2017 and Principal Staff Officer to the Chief of the Defence Staff in August 2018. In February 2020 Smeath was appointed Head of the British Defence Staff and Defence Attaché in Washington, D.C. with effect from August 2020.

Smeath was appointed a Member of the Order of the British Empire in the 2001 Birthday Honours and advanced to Commander of the Order of the British Empire in the 2018 New Year Honours.

References

1967 births
Living people
Alumni of King's College London
Commanders of the Order of the British Empire
Royal Air Force Regiment officers
Royal Air Force air marshals
British air attachés